Manuel Magistrado "M.C." Caceres is a Filipino professional basketball player for the Imus Bandera of the Maharlika Pilipinas Basketball League (MPBL). He was the fourteenth pick overall by the Coca-Cola Tigers in the 2006 PBA draft.

PBA career statistics

Season-by-season averages

|-
| align=left | 
| align=left | Coca-Cola
| 13 || 12.2 || .419 || .000 || .357 || 2.5 || .2 || .1 || .2 || 4.4
|-
| align=left | 
| align=left | Coca-Cola
| 6 || 15.7 || .250 || .286 || .500 || 2.8 || .8 || .0 || .3 || 3.0
|-
| align=left | 
| align=left | Coca-Cola
| 2 || 4.5 || .000 || .000 || .000 || 1.0 || .0 || .0 || .0 || .0
|-
| align=left | Career
| align=left |
| 21 || 12.4 || .363 || .222 || .389 || 2.4 || .3 || .1 || .2 || 3.6

References

Living people
Filipino men's basketball players
Power forwards (basketball)
People from Marikina
Basketball players from Metro Manila
Powerade Tigers players
Year of birth missing (living people)
Maharlika Pilipinas Basketball League players